Tanqueray is a brand of gin produced by Diageo plc. It originated in London. While it does not command a sizable market share in its native market, its largest market is the United States.

Tanqueray is a London dry gin, reflecting its distillation process and origin in Bloomsbury, London. London dry gin is made by double distilling grain, with select botanicals added during the second distillation. While the Tanqueray recipe is a closely guarded trade secret, it is known to contain four botanicals: juniper, coriander, angelica root and liquorice, all common botanicals in gin productions overall.

It is one of Diageo's sixteen "strategic brands" earmarked for prioritisation in promotion and distribution worldwide.

History
Tanqueray gin was initially distilled in 1830 by Charles Tanqueray in the Bloomsbury district of London. The retail outlet of Edward & Charles Tanqueray & Co was established on Vine Street, London, in 1838. When Charles died in 1868, his son Charles Waugh Tanqueray inherited the distillery, which continued to operate until it was severely damaged during World War II. The only facility to survive the Axis bombing, now known as "Old Tom", has since been moved to Cameron Bridge, Scotland.

In accordance with a report by The Spirits Business, Tanqueray was the highest selling gin in the world for 2016, with nearly three million nine-litre cases sold.

Products

Tanqueray London Dry Gin is the original product that was launched in 1830; its key botanicals are juniper, coriander, angelica root and liquorice. It is variously sold as:

 IMPORTED 47.3% ABV (United States, Canada, Germany and European duty-free shops)
 Export Strength 43.1% ABV (United Kingdom, Norway and Sweden)
 40% ABV (Australia, Canada, and New Zealand)

Tanqueray No. Ten Gin (47.3%) was introduced in 2000 and is targeted at the martini market. It is distilled four times with whole fresh grapefruit, orange, lime and chamomile flowers

Tanqueray Sterling Vodka was introduced in 1989 and is available in both neutral and citrus flavours. Its main market is the United States.

Tanqueray Rangpur Gin was introduced in Maryland, Delaware, and Washington, D.C. in the summer of 2006. It has a strong citrus flavor, the result of rangpur limes, ginger, and bay leaves added during the final distillation process. It is produced at 82.6 proof (41.3% abv) and is now available throughout the United States and Canada.

Tanqueray Malacca Gin was introduced in 1997 as a "wetter" alternative to the London Dry, with more sweetness and a stronger fruit palate (most notably grapefruit). Discontinued in 2001, Diageo announced on 12 December 2012 (12/12/12) that a 16,000-case limited edition of Tanqueray Malacca would be relaunched in the US, Great Britain, Canada and Western Europe  for February 2013.

Tanqueray Blackcurrant Royale Gin was introduced in 2021. It has a rich fruity flavor with taste of French blackcurrant, vanilla and exotic floral notes.

In 2021 Tanqueray launched a non-alcoholic variety of the original called Tanqueray 0.0 , bottled at 0.0%abv.

Past offerings from Tanqueray also include both orange and lemon gins, produced from 1937 until 1957, when both were phased out.

Notable spirit ratings for Tanqueray included a string of Double Golds (for its basic London Dry) for 2005–2007 from the San Francisco World Spirits Competition.  Later years' competitions saw Tanqueray win a string of silver medals and then another double gold in 2012.  Wine Enthusiast rated the London Dry in its "96–100" category in 2007 but gave it a "90–95" in 2011.

Advertising
Tanqueray introduced "Mr. Jenkins", a white-haired, well-dressed spokes-character, in print ads in 1994. He was retired a few years later. In 2004 Tanqueray introduced "Tony Sinclair", a younger, foppish hipster socialite spokes-character in television ads created by Conor Sheridan. Sinclair's catchphrase at the end of every commercial was "Ready to Tanqueray?" followed by a manic laugh. He was portrayed by Rodney Mason as a madcap socialite of Black British descent.

In the 2008 Mad Men episode "The Jet Set", Duck Phillips receives a crate of Tanqueray from his British former advertising colleagues as enticement for Duck to initiate their firm's purchase of Sterling Cooper.

References

Works cited

External links
 Official website of Tanqueray gin
Tanqueray  on thebar UK, owned by Diageo

1830 introductions
British Royal Warrant holders
Diageo brands
Gins
1830 establishments in England